The brainchild of music composer, singer, and guitar player Varun Rajput, Antariksh is a premier, multi-award winning Indian Pop/Rock act based out of Delhi, India. Antariksh collaborated with former Megadeth Guitarist, Marty Friedman on their critically acclaimed song, ‘Quest’ and won the ‘Best Rock Song’ Award at Artist Aloud Independent Music Awards 2022 and ‘Best Rock Artist of 2022’ at The Indian Music Diaries Awards.

History

From 2006 to 2008, during their college days, Varun Rajput and Mridul Ganesh (Former singer of the band) used to play in a local Progressive Rock band called Feedback, with Gurtej Singh (Former guitar player) playing for Prestorika around the same time. However, music took a back seat as they ventured into the corporate world.
A few years later, both Mridul and Varun decided to quit their management consulting jobs around the same time in 2012 to work on more creative projects. During this time Varun and Gurtej also had been having conversations about starting a new project and were longing to get back to music. The three of them then decided to get together to work on some tunes. It wasn't long when they had already written 3 songs and were ready to take this even further.

They released their first song ‘Dheere Dheere’ in January 2013, which was appreciated by a variety of audience. This propelled the trio to record a full-length album and find a drummer and a bass player to begin playing live. Soon the hunt for a drummer and a bass player began during which they came across Vipul, through a mutual friend. Vipul Malhotra (Former drummer) was studying at NSIT at that time and was a great fit into the set-up. Finally, Varun asked his friend Raghav Verma (Former bass player) to join the team.

With the setup finally complete, they decided to take the plunge to record and produce an album during the summer of 2013 for their new band ‘Antariksh’.

Debut album

After one year of the band coming together they released their debut album, titled ‘Khoj' on 8 September 2013. The album was a blend of pop, rock, funk, and progressive sounds, featured 11 tracks, mixed at the Quarter Note Studio by Gaurav Chintamani, and mastered by Steve Nagasaki at Nagasaki Sound, USA.

In November 2015, they were featured on Season 4 of Music Mojo, a popular music show on Kappa TV which features live renditions of 11 songs performed by the band.

Present

Antariksh recently released their latest single, ‘Kaahe Re’ in association with Mrrcury Studios and Anhad Music.
Kaahe Re has received praise for its rhythmic syncopation, melodic prowess and anthem riffs.

Antariksh recently performed at the 10th addition of the Bacardi NH7 Weekender in Meghalaya.

International presence

In October 2019 Antariksh went on their first international multi-city  tour to Mauritius and Madagascar. They played at various venues in Mauritius which included the Indira Gandhi Centre for Indian Culture, Centre de Flacq and Triolet. In Madagascar they performed for the Indian audiences in an event organized by the embassy of India in the Ampefiloha Plaza in Antananarivo, the capital of Madagascar.

Discography

ALBUMS
Khoj
Released on 8 September 2013,

Track list:
SINGLES

 Quest feat. Marty Friedman
 Fanaah
 Kaahe Re
 Raahiya
 Jee Le Zara
 Aashayein - Live
 Kaisi Ye Jeet?
 Ye Jhootha Samaa feat. Shruti Dhasmana, Abhay Sharma
 Quest (Reprise) feat. Marty Friedman

References

Culture of Delhi
Indian rock music groups
Musical groups established in the 2000s